Brachyopa bimaculosa is a European species of hoverflies.

Distribution
Germany, Greece, Slovenia.

References

Diptera of Europe
Eristalinae
Insects described in 2004